Keleanohoanaapiapi, short name Kelea, was an ancient Hawaiian noblewoman who is mentioned in ancient legends, and her genealogy is given in chants. She was a Princess (Hawaiian language: Aliʻi) of Maui, one of the Hawaiian Islands. She was a High Chiefess, but not of the highest known rank.

Legend about her abduction can be compared to the myth of Helen of Troy.

Family 
Keleanohoanaapiapi was a daughter of High Chief Kahekili I the Great of Maui and his wife, Lady Haukanuimakamaka of Kauai, and thus a sister of Chief Kawaokaohele.

Life 

Keleanohoanaapiapi was most likely born on the island of Maui.

She was considered very beautiful and became a wife to the handsome Prince Lo Lale of Oahu, brother of King Piliwale. They had three children. Lo Lale and Keleanohoanaapiapi were later divorced.

Keleanohoanaapiapi later married a noble named Kalamakua. Their daughter was Queen La’ieloheloheikawai, wife of King Piʻilani of Maui.

Crater 
There is a crater called Keleanohoanaapiapi on Venus.

References

Royalty of Maui
Royalty of Oahu
Hawaiian legends
Hawaiian royal consorts
Hawaiian princesses